Thrapston Midland Road railway station is a former railway station on the Kettering, Thrapston and Huntingdon Railway line from Kettering. The station officially closed to Passengers on 15 June 1959. However the actual last passengers left the platform on the 8.30pm from Kettering on the evening of 13 June 1959. The train was hauled by steam locomotive and tender 46467 a Class 2 Ivatt LMS Mogul 2-6-0.

Thrapston Station Quarry, formerly called Thrapston Midland Railway Station Quarry, is a geological Site of Special Scientific Interest.

See also 
 List of closed railway stations in Britain

References

Disused railway stations in Northamptonshire
Railway stations in Great Britain opened in 1866
Railway stations in Great Britain closed in 1959
Former Midland Railway stations
1866 establishments in England
Thrapston